WCBH (104.3 FM) is a CHR/Top 40 radio station licensed to Casey, Illinois, United States. The station serves the Terre Haute, Indiana, and Mattoon/Effingham, Illinois, areas and points in between, and is currently owned by Cromwell Radio Group, through licensee The Cromwell Group, Inc. of Illinois.

References

External links
 

CBH
Contemporary hit radio stations in the United States